Propyne (methylacetylene) is an alkyne with the chemical formula .  It is a component of MAPD gas—along with its isomer propadiene (allene), which was commonly used in gas welding. Unlike acetylene, propyne can be safely condensed.

Production and equilibrium with propadiene
Propyne exists in equilibrium with propadiene, the mixture of propyne and propadiene being called MAPD:
H3CC#CH  <=>  H2C=C=CH2
The coefficient of equilibrium Keq is 0.22 at 270 °C or 0.1 at 5 °C.
MAPD is produced as a side product, often an undesirable one, by cracking propane to produce propene, an important feedstock in the chemical industry.  MAPD interferes with the catalytic polymerization of propene.

Laboratory methods
Propyne can also be synthesized on laboratory scale by reducing 1-propanol, allyl alcohol or acetone vapors over magnesium.

Use as a rocket fuel
European space companies have researched using light hydrocarbons with liquid oxygen, a relatively high performing liquid rocket propellant combination that would also be less toxic than the commonly used MMH/NTO (monomethylhydrazine/nitrogen tetroxide). Their research showed that propyne would be highly advantageous as a rocket fuel for craft intended for low Earth orbital operations. They reached this conclusion based upon a specific impulse expected to reach 370 s with oxygen as the oxidizer, a high density and power density—and the moderate boiling point, which makes the chemical easier to store than fuels that must be kept at extremely low temperatures. (See cryogenics.)

Organic chemistry
Propyne is a convenient three-carbon building block for organic synthesis. Deprotonation with n-butyllithium gives propynyllithium. This nucleophilic reagent adds to carbonyl groups, producing alcohols and esters.  Whereas purified propyne is expensive, MAPP gas could be used to cheaply generate large amounts of the reagent.

Propyne, along with 2-butyne, is also used to synthesize alkylated hydroquinones in the total synthesis of vitamin E.

The chemical shift of an alkynyl proton and propargylic proton generally occur in the same region of the 1H NMR spectrum.  In propyne, these two signals have almost exactly the same chemical shifts, leading to overlap of the signals, and the 1H NMR spectrum of propyne, when recorded in deuteriochloroform on a 300 MHz instrument, consists of a single signal, a sharp singlet resonating at 1.8 ppm.

Notes

References

External links
 NIST Chemistry WebBook page for propyne
 German Aerospace Center
 Nova Chemicals
 CDC - NIOSH Pocket Guide to Chemical Hazards

Alkynes
Fuel gas
Rocket fuels